The Grand Lycée Franco-Libanais (GLFL) is a prestigious French lycée in the Achrafieh district of Beirut, founded in 1909 by the Mission laïque française. The institution leads as the flagship of the French lycées operating in Lebanon. It is recognised as a French international school by the Agency for French Education Abroad (AEFE).

History 

Just over a century old, the Grand Lycée has made its way through Lebanese modern history. The Lebanese civil war, which began in 1975, marks the most serious crisis the Grand Lycée ever faced. The buildings were badly damaged and due to their proximity to the Green Line, access was difficult. From 1996 to 2003, the lycée undertook comprehensive renovations, where all the "Ecochard" buildings were rehabilitated and new structures were constructed. The stadium "Stade du Chayla" was inaugurated on 25 March 2005 and renovated in 2018.

Initially located in the Sodeco neighborhood near the central Beirut district, it later moved to Beni Assaf Street, near the French embassy and Saint Joseph University in the Badaro neighborhood. GLFL has ten buildings, five of which were conceived by the French planner Michel Ecochard, and also added a new athletic stadium on Damascus street: "Le stade de Chayla".

Organisation 
Brice Léthier was the previous headmaster of the Grand Lycée. The school offers classes to more than 3,600 students. It remains the flagship institution of the Mission Laïque Française organisation and leads its eight established schools in Lebanon.

School departments include 3 libraries in which students can find a network of computers intended for educational resources, as well as 27,000 books and literary archives including newspapers, novels, and magazines. A secondary library known as the BCD is also available to younger students.

Across the street, the brand new Stade du Chayla comprises a track-and-field playground, along with tennis, badminton, basketball and mini-soccer courts. The building includes table tennis and squash halls as well as an indoor swimming pool.

Notable alumni 
 Marwan Hamadeh, Minister of Telecommunications, Economy, Trade and Health
 Gebran Tueni, Editor-in-chief of An-Nahar and Member of Parliament
 Fares Souhaid, General Secretary of the March 14 Coalition and Member of Parliament
 Samir Kassir, journalist
 Nassim Nicholas Taleb, author of The Black Swan
 Nabil Bukhalid, Former Chief Enterprise Architect at American University of Beirut

See also
 Education in the Ottoman Empire

References

External links
 Grand Lycée Official website (French)
 Official alumni community

Further reading
French:
 Jean-Pierre BEL Le Grand Lycée franco-libanais, 100 ans au service de la MLF et du Liban. Chemaly (Beirut), 2010.

French international schools in Lebanon
International schools in Beirut
Educational institutions established in 1909
1909 establishments in the Ottoman Empire